Tyrol Valley is a high ice-free valley lying east of Mount Baldr in the Asgard Range, Victoria Land. The valley was named by Austrian biologist Heinz Janetschek, a participant in the United States Antarctic Research Program (USARP) program in this area in 1961–62, after his native Tirol (Tyrol).

Further reading 
 B.A. Whitton, M. Potts, The Ecology of Cyanobacteria: Their Diversity in Time and Space, P 361 
 L. KAPPEN, E. I. FRIEDMANN and J. GARTY, Ecophysiology of Lichens in the Dry Valleys of Southern Victoria Land, Antarctica: Microclimate of the Cryptoendolithic Lichen Habitat, Flora (1981) 171: 216–235, P 231
 H.S. Vishniac,  Microbial Ecology of Extreme Environments: Antarctic Dry Valley Yeasts and Growth in Substrate-limited Habitats, PP 2 - 4

References 

Valleys of Victoria Land
McMurdo Dry Valleys